The Dobrynin RD-7 or "VD-7" is a Soviet single-shaft axial-flow turbojet engine, which was produced in a small series. "RD" means реактивный двигатель (jet engine). Designed by designer Vladimir Alekseevich Dobrynin (the original designation is VD-7), it was intended for installation on the Myasishchev Type 103 strategic bomber (M-4, later 3M).

Variants 
 VD-7B:
 VD-7P:
 RD-7M:
 RD-7M-2:
 VD-7MD:

Applications
Tupolev Tu-22
Myasishchev M-50
Myasishchev VM-T
Caspian Sea Monster

Specifications (VD-7M)

See also

External links
RD-7 on авиару.рф 

1950s turbojet engines
Soviet and Russian aircraft engines